Roselys (formerly HMS Sundew) was one of the nine s lent by the Royal Navy to the Free French Naval Forces. She served as a naval escort in World War II.

Construction
The vessel was ordered on 21 September 1939. She was constructed in Aberdeen by J. Lewis and Sons Ltd. Her keel was laid on 4 November 1940. The ship was assigned dock number 155. She was launched on 28 May 1941. The vessel was finally commissioned on 19 September 1941.

Other Flower-class ships in Free French service retained their original flower names translated into French. However, the French for sundew, rosée du matin (literally "morning dew"), was considered unsuitable and the girl's name Roselys ("Rose-Lilly") was used instead, perhaps with the intention of linking the English Tudor rose with the French fleur-de-lys.

War service
On 30 January 1942, Roselys spotted a U-boat about 400 yards from her. She turned towards the U-boat with the intention to ram it. The U-boat attempted to dive, but it was lightly rammed before it could submerge. As she passed over the U-boat, depth charges were dropped. The U-boat was probably only lightly damaged, and escaped back to port. She was part of Convoy QP 13, and rescued 179 survivors on 5 July 1942 when several ships ran into naval mines. On 10 March 1943, she picked up 81 survivors from the British merchant Tucurina. Roselys was one of nine Free French escort vessels which supported the Normandy landings on and after 6 June 1944, protecting the movement of landing and supply ships across the English Channel.

Fate
She was returned to the Royal Navy in 1947. She was sold  on 23 October 1947, and scrapped at Troon in May 1948.

References

Sources
 (2016 edition)

4

1941 ships
Ships built in Aberdeen
Flower-class corvettes of the Free French Naval Forces
World War II corvettes of France